Micaëla Ana María Cousiño y Quiñones de León (30 April 1938 – 13 March 2022) was a Chilean-Spanish noblewoman and second wife of Henri, Count of Paris, Orléanist pretender to the French throne from 1999 until his death in 2019.

Early life 
Micaëla Ana María Cousiño y Quiñones de León was born in Vichy, Allier, France, on 30 April 1938. She was the daughter of Luis Maximiliano Cousiño y Sébire, heir to one of the largest family fortunes of Chile, dating from the 18th century, and his wife, Antonia Quiñones de Léon y Bañuelos, 4th Marchioness of San Carlos, of the marquesses of Montevirgen.

Career 
Micaëla Cousiño started her career on the radio in France. Later, she worked for a press agency - a large advertising group both in Madrid and in Paris. From 1978 to May 1981, she became responsible for the communication of the minister and the senior directors at the cabinet of then government minister Raymond Barre. She also worked as an employee of the Cancer Research Association for a year in 1982. 

Since the accession of her late husband as head of the Royal House of Orléans, she became involved with the family's activities and participated in many events together with other members of the de jure royal family.

Marriages and children 
Micaela Cousiño was married twice. Firstly she married civilly Jean-Robert Bœuf in 1961, with whom she had a child, Alexis Bœuf. Secondly, in 1984, she married Henri d'Orléans, Count of Paris, having had no offspring from this marriage.

Henri d'Orléans, then Count of Clermont, and Micaëla married civilly in 1984. This marriage was without the consent of Henri's father, then head of the House of Orléans, who initially declared Henri disinherited, substituting the non-dynastic title Comte de Mortain for his son's Clermont countship (the latter once held in appanage by a son of Louis IX of France, who became ancestor of the Bourbon-Orléans line). Henri refused to acknowledge this title, but this act created a lasting division within the Orléans family.

Tensions lessened after several years, and on 7 March 1991 the Count of Paris reinstated Henri as heir apparent and Count of Clermont.

Micaëla died on 13 March 2022 at the age of 83 in Paris.

Ancestors

See also 
 Orléanist

References

Bibliography 
 
 

1938 births
2022 deaths
House of Orléans
Countesses of Paris
French princesses
French people of Spanish descent 
French people of Chilean descent
People from Vichy
Chilean nobility
20th-century Spanish nobility